Aminu Ibrahim Daurawa (born 1 January 1969) also known with his honorific as Sheikh Daurawa, is a Nigerian Islamic scholar.

Early life and education
He was born on 1 January 1969 at Mazugal Dala Local Government Area of Kano State, Nigeria. 

In 2004, he attended Bayero University Kano state where he studied Mass Communication although he did not graduate. He then proceeded to Benin private university, which has a branch in Kano state, but did not complete his studies there either.

Work
In 2017 Daurawa tells  the Emir of Kano Sanusi Lamido Sanusi that, your proposal on polygamy will violate the Qur'an. He says “Those of us in the North have all seen the economic consequences of men who are not capable of maintaining one wife, marrying four. They end up producing 20 children, not educating them, leaving them on the streets. Allah position on marriage is sacrosanct as stated in the Holy Quran and any infringement is nullity, Daurawa said. "What needs to be done is not enactment of a law that would bar the poor from marrying more than one wife but rather enlightenment on the intricacies of polygamy. 

Daurawa is under the First Aid Group of Jama'atu Izalatil Bidi'a Wa'iƙamatis Sunnah known as Izala and  founder of Hisbah Corps in Kano. After founding the corp he became its chairman, the main aim of Hisbah is to eradicate immorality within society, especially in Kano city (Islamic religion adherents) and was registered under the Kano State Commission for Religious Affair.

See also
Hisba Nigeria
Izala Society

References

External links

1969 births
Living people
People from Kano State
Nigerian Islamists
Nigerian scholars